São Francisco is a municipality located in the Brazilian state of Sergipe. Its population was 3,781 (2020) and its area is 83 km².

References

Municipalities in Sergipe